Unión Deportiva Oliva is a Spanish football team based in Valencia, in the Valencian Community. Founded in 1946, it plays in Primera Regional – Group 7, holding home matches at Estadio El Morer.

Season to season

1 season in Segunda División B
16 seasons in Tercera División

References

External links
BDFutbol team profile
Fútbol Regional team profile 

Football clubs in the Valencian Community
Association football clubs established in 1946
1946 establishments in Spain
Sport in Valencia